Pterula is a genus of fungi in the Pterulaceae family. The genus has a widespread distribution, especially in tropical regions, and contains about 50 species.
One such species, Pterula sp. 82168, has yielded potential antifungal antibiotic properties.

Taxonomy 
A major reclassification of the Pterulaceae family occurred in occurred in 2020 and Pterula was reclassified based on phylogenetic analysis and split into Pterula, Myrmecopterula, Pterulicium and Phaeopterula genera by the mycologists Caio A. Leal-Dutra, Bryn Tjader Mason Dentinger and Gareth W. Griffith.

Species 
, Species Fungorum accepted 67 species of Pterula.

References

External links

Pterulaceae
Agaricales genera
Taxa named by Elias Magnus Fries